Juke Magazine was a weekly Australian rock and pop newspaper published in Melbourne that ran from 1975 to 1992. It was founded by Ed Nimmervoll (former editor of Go-Set magazine) who was the editor and one of its writers. Juke also featured Australian music journalist Christie Eliezer as a key staff writer and rock photographers such as Graeme Webber, Bob King, Tony Mott and David Parker. It was one of two main music newspapers at the time offering a Melbourne-based perspective of the music industry. It was highly regarded by the music industry along with its main competitor Rock Australia Magazine (aka RAM) which offered a more Sydney-based perspective and coverage of the Australian music industry at the time.

A key and popular feature of Juke Magazine was its extensive gig guide (particularly of Melbourne's music scene), which attracted a lot of attention by bands, booking agencies and venues. Over time Juke took a more national focus as a music newspaper and the gig guide also evolved to cover more of a national perspective of gigs across Australia.

Juke Magazine is now archived with the  Victorian Arts Centre Trust to preserve its important legacy to the history of Australian music and impact on Australian popular culture.

Sources
 Juke Magazine Collection held in the Australian Performing Arts Collection, Arts Centre Melbourne

References

1975 establishments in Australia
1992 disestablishments in Australia
Music magazines published in Australia
Defunct magazines published in Australia
English-language magazines
Magazines established in 1975
Magazines disestablished in 1992
Magazines published in Melbourne
Weekly magazines published in Australia